National Route 284 is a national highway of Japan connecting Rikuzentakata, Iwate and Ichinoseki, Iwate in Japan, with a total length of 71.9 km (44.68 mi).

References

National highways in Japan
Roads in Iwate Prefecture
Roads in Miyagi Prefecture